Lorenzo Noviello (born 2 March 2002) is a Belgian professional footballer who plays as a midfielder for Eerste Divisie club MVV.

Career

Westerlo
In 2021, Noviello signed a season-long contract with Westerlo with an option for a further season. It was the first professional contract of his career. He made his professional debut on 15 August 2021, replacing Ján Bernát in the 82nd minute of a 2–0 away win over Virton in the Challenger Pro League.

MVV
Noviello joined Eerste Divisie club MVV Maastricht on 20 June 2022, signing a one-year contract.

Career statistics

Honours 
Westerlo
 Belgian First Division B: 2021–22

References

External links
 

2002 births
Living people
Belgian footballers
Association football midfielders
K.R.C. Genk players
K.V.C. Westerlo players
MVV Maastricht players
Challenger Pro League players
Sportspeople from Genk
Footballers from Limburg (Belgium)
Belgian expatriate footballers
Expatriate footballers in the Netherlands
Belgian expatriate sportspeople in the Netherlands